Aglaoschema mimos is a species of beetle in the family Cerambycidae. It was described by Napp in 2008.

References

Aglaoschema
Beetles described in 2008